Pan Radio is a Bosnian local commercial radio station, broadcasting from Bijeljina, Bosnia and Herzegovina. This radio station broadcasts a variety of programs such music and local news.

The owner of the local radio station is the company Panorama - pres d.o.o. Bijeljina.

Pan Radio was established on 1 August 1997. Program is mainly produced in Serbian language at one FM frequency (Bijeljina ) and it is available in the city of Bijeljina as well as in nearby municipalities in Semberija area.

Estimated number of listeners of Pan Radio is around 66.597.

Frequencies
 Bijeljina

See also 
 List of radio stations in Bosnia and Herzegovina
 BN Radio
 Bobar Radio
 Bobar Radio - Studio B2 
 RSG Radio
 Daš Radio
 Daš Extra Radio

References

External links 
 www.pan-radio.com
 www.radiostanica.ba
 www.fmscan.org
 Communications Regulatory Agency of Bosnia and Herzegovina

Bijeljina
Radio stations established in 1997
Bijeljina
Mass media in Bijeljina